Jeanette Loff (born Janette Clarinda Lov; October 9, 1906 – August 4, 1942) was an American actress, musician, and singer who came to prominence for her appearances in several Pathé Exchange and Universal Pictures films in the 1920s.

Born in Idaho, Loff was raised throughout the Pacific Northwest, and began singing professionally as a lyric soprano and performing as an organist while a teenager in Portland, Oregon. She studied music at the Ellison-White Conservatory of Music. After moving to Los Angeles, California, Loff was signed to a film contract by producer Cecil B. DeMille, with Pathé Exchange in 1927. She subsequently signed a contract with Universal Pictures. She appeared in over twenty films during the course of her seven-year career, with lead parts in such films as Hold 'Em Yale (1928) and the controversial crime film Party Girl (1930). She also appeared in the musical King of Jazz (1930) as a vocalist.

Loff formally retired from acting in 1934, with her last screen credit in Joseph Santley's Million Dollar Baby (1934). She died on August 4, 1942, from ammonia poisoning in Los Angeles at the age of 35. Though law enforcement was unable to determine whether her death was an accident or a suicide, Loff's family maintained that she had been murdered.

Life and career

1906–1925: Early life
Jeanette Loff was born Janette Clarinda Lov in Orofino, Idaho to Marius (1878–1961) and Inga  ( Loseth; 1885–1971) Lov. She was the eldest of three siblings. Her father, a farmer and a barber who played the violin in local orchestras, was a first-generation American born to Danish parents. Her mother was also a first-generation American, born to Norwegian parents. Marius relocated the family to Ottertail, Minnesota, where Loff lived with her younger sister Irene (1907–1993). They next moved to Wadena, Saskatchewan, Canada, in 1912 where Marius opened a barbershop. Another sister, Myrtle (1914–1957), was born there. Loff attended Lewiston High School in Lewiston, Idaho.

At the age of 11, Loff played the title role in a theatrical production of Snow White and the Seven Dwarfs. At age 16 she was a lyric soprano and had the leading role in an operetta Treasure Hunters. When she was 17 the family moved to Portland, Oregon, where Loff continued her musical education at the Ellison-White Conservatory of Music. She played the organ at theaters in Portland under the name Jan Lov. She sometimes appeared singing theater prologues during vacations from school.

1926–1936: Film career

After moving to Los Angeles, California to pursue a career in entertainment, Loff married jewelry salesman Harry K. Roseboom on October 8, 1926; their divorce was finalized three years later in Portland on October 8, 1929, with Loff claiming Roseboom became jealous and violent toward her because of her budding film career.

Loff's motion picture career began with an uncredited role in the 1927 silent film adaptation of Uncle Tom's Cabin. She was signed to a contract by Cecil B. DeMille with Pathé Exchange, anglicising her surname from Lov to Loff. She was soon cast as in ingénue roles in almost every instance, which enticed her to take a break from her movie career and perform on stage. In 1928, Loff was the first person to ride with Santa Claus down Hollywood Boulevard at the first Santa Claus Lane Parade in Los Angeles. In 1930, Pathé opted not to renew Loff's contract, after which she signed with Universal Pictures.

Loff's last screen role before she briefly retired was in the Paul Whiteman revue King of Jazz (1930). Her performance as a vocalist in the film was praised by Mordaunt Hall in a New York Times review. She also had a lead role in Party Girl (1930) opposite Douglas Fairbanks Jr., and received critical acclaim for her performance. The film, however, was controversial due to its depiction of an escort agency, and was banned in some U.S. cities.

Loff remained under contract to Universal for some months but made no additional films for the studio. Her absence from the film industry was noted in a 1933 issue of Motion Picture Magazine, in addition to speculation about her personal life:

1934–1942: Retirement
Around 1934, Loff relocated to New York City and appeared in musical plays and with orchestras, before returning to films with a role as a country girl in Flirtation. Her final motion picture performances came in Hide-Out and the Joseph Santley-directed Million Dollar Baby, all released in 1934. After retiring from film, Loff wed Los Angeles businessman Bertram Eli Friedlob in 1936.

Death
On August 1, 1942, Loff ingested ammonia at the Beverly Hills home she shared with husband Friedlob on 9233 Doheny Road. The ammonia ingestion caused severe chemical burns to her throat and mouth. She died three days later of ammonia poisoning on August 4, 1942, in Los Angeles.

The New York Times reported Loff had ingested the ammonia "on the coast," and coroners were unable to determine whether she ingested ammonia either accidentally or intentionally. She had been suffering from a stomach ailment and may have accidentally taken the wrong bottle of medication. While Loff's death could not be patently ruled either accident or suicide, her family maintained that she had been murdered. Loff is interred at Forest Lawn Cemetery in Glendale, California.

Filmography

See also
List of unsolved deaths

Notes

References

Sources

Further reading
Albert Lea Evening Tribune  "Hollywood Sights and Sounds", January 9, 1934, Page 9.
Los Angeles Times  "Jeanette Loff", August 8, 1942, Page 7.
The New York Times  "Miss Loff Dies of Poison", August 6, 1942, Page 22.
Dallas Morning News "Jeanette Loff, 35, former screen actress, died at Hollywood Presbyterian Hospital", August 6, 1942

External links 

Jeanette Loff at Virtual History

1906 births
1942 deaths
20th-century American actresses
20th-century American singers
20th-century American women singers
20th-century organists
Actresses from Idaho
Actresses from Portland, Oregon
American film actresses
American operatic sopranos
American organists
American people of Danish descent
American people of Norwegian descent
American silent film actresses
American stage actresses
Burials at Forest Lawn Memorial Park (Glendale)
Deaths by ammonia poisoning
Ellison-White Conservatory of Music alumni
People from Orofino, Idaho
Singers from Idaho
Unsolved deaths in the United States
Women organists